The Mediterranean tree frog (Hyla meridionalis), or stripeless tree frog, is a species of frog found in south-west Europe and north-west Africa. The croaking resembles that of H. arborea, but it is deeper and slower. 

The Hyla meridionalis generally breed from the end of March through the beginning of July; their breeding is dependent on a few variables, including water availability. The strapless tree frog has a larval period of 15 days.

Distribution
This frog is found in central and southern Portugal, Spain (from Catalonia to Andalusia and Extremadura), southern France, northern Italy (only Liguria), Morocco, northern Algeria and northern Tunisia. It also has ancient introduced populations in Madeira and the Canary Islands and a recent introduction in Menorca.

References

 Stöck M., Dubey S., Klütsch C., Litvinchuk S. N., Schleidt U., and Perrin N. (2008): Mitochondrial and nuclear phylogeny of circum-Mediterranean tree frogs from the Hyla arborea group. Molecular Phylogenetics and Evolution 49: 1019-1024.

External links

Hyla
Fauna of the Canary Islands
Amphibians of Europe
Frogs of Africa
Amphibians described in 1874